Komintern (formerly Nooken or Naukent) is a village in Jalal-Abad Region of Kyrgyzstan. It is part of Nooken District. Its population was 4,498 in 2021. It lies along the M41 highway (Bishkek–Osh), between Masy and Kochkor-Ata. It was part of Fergana Oblast in the Russian Empire. Historically it had a citadel due to its strategical location, which was taken by Shahbaz.

References

Populated places in Jalal-Abad Region